Edna Barker (24 November 1936 – 25 March 2019) was an English cricketer who played as a right-handed batter and right-arm off break bowler. She appeared in 15 Test matches for England between 1957 and 1969. She played domestic cricket for Surrey.

References

External links
 
 

1936 births
2019 deaths
Cricketers from Surrey
England women Test cricketers
Surrey women cricketers